The Porsche 989 was a 4-door performance-oriented touring sedan developed by Porsche between 1988 and 1991. This vehicle was never produced, after development was halted in late 1991 and cancelled in January 1992.

History
Increased sales of Porsche's 928 model during the mid-1980s prompted executives to consider adding another large, sporty touring vehicle to the lineup, this time a 4-door that could serve as a more practical but equally powerful and exciting alternative to the 928. Porsche engineer Dr. Ulrich Bez was put in charge of the project and given instructions that the vehicle should be luxurious and comfortable but offer a sporting nature superior to that attained by large saloon cars from Mercedes-Benz and BMW.

Some discrepancy has arisen as to the engine displacement, which is reported as being between 3.6 and 4.2 litres.

The prototype made from Bez's technical designs was styled by Harm Lagaay, a design which influenced later models and that held many similarities to the 911, despite the difference in engine placement. Specific design influences to later Porsche models include the control-arm suspension and 959-esque headlamps which would later be used on the 993 as well as the overall shape and tail-light design which were adapted for the 996 generation 911.

After Ulrich Bez left Porsche in September 1991, the project lost momentum. The severe slump in 928 sales made executives re-think the viability of the idea, and low overall profits during the 1989 to 1991 model years meant the model would be far more risky for the company to build than had been anticipated during development. In January 1992, development was halted completely. Although Porsche officials initially claimed that the only prototype was destroyed, it had actually been put into storage. A rear-view photograph of the prototype (silver color, 17 inch Cup II wheels, unregistered licence plate BB-PW 989) is published in the German classic car magazine Motor Klassik. Autoweek also reported the existence of the prototype. The prototype would eventually become an exhibit at the Porsche Museum in Stuttgart.  

As of 2019, it is exhibited at the Petersen Auto Museum in Los Angeles.  Styling cues found in the next generation Porsche 911 (996) see their origins from this prototype.

The Porsche Panamera, launched in 2009, is considered to be the spiritual successor to the 989 project.

References

Further reading

Ludvigsen, Karl (2003). Porsche: Excellence Was Expected (second edition). Bentley Publishers. .
Kable, Greg, and Bob Gritzinger (2005). "Panamera Flagship Gets Go-Ahead". Autoweek, August 6, 2005.

989
Sports sedans